Precious Lord: New Recordings of the Great Songs of Thomas A. Dorsey is a 1973 album by Rev. Thomas A. Dorsey. The recording features Dorsey's account of his life, as well as contemporary performances of his greatest works. Composer of many enduring gospel classics, Dorsey is considered to be the Father of Gospel Music.

In 2002, the Library of Congress honored the album by adding it to the United States National Recording Registry.

Track listing

1973 albums
United States National Recording Registry recordings
United States National Recording Registry albums